The Herman Wildenvey Poetry Award is a Norwegian award. It is conferred every year on July 20, the birthday of the poet Herman Wildenvey, in an event held at Hergisheim. The award consists of NOK 15,000 and a bronze relief plaque designed by the sculptor Ørnulf Bast. 

The award is given to a person or institution that has helped foster interest in Herman Wildenvey's poetry and stimulated efforts for his poetic values to hold a greater place in everyday life.

The award was conferred for the first time in 1996 by the Wildenvey Society. After this society became defunct in 2014, the award still continued at the initiative of the former directors of the society.

Winners
 1996: Kjell Heggelund
 1997: Torild Wardenær
 1998: Halvor Roll
 1999: Liv Dommersnes
 2000: Marit Beinset Waagaard
 2001: Kolbein Falkeid
 2002: Annie Riis
 2003: Aftenposten
 2004: Benny Borg
 2005: Odd Børretzen
 2006: Lise Fjeldstad
 2007: Magnus Grønneberg
 2008: Kristin Solli Schøien
 2009: Louis Jacoby
 2010: Tom Lotherington
 2011: Finn Wellberg
 2012: Rolf Bergersen
 2014: Øyvind Straume
 2015: Steinar Opstad
 2016: Helge Torvund
 2017: Annelita Meinich

References

Norwegian literary awards
Culture in Vestfold og Telemark
Awards established in 1996